Live in London is the first live album by American country music artist Ricky Skaggs. It was released in 1985 via Epic Records. The album peaked at number 1 on the Billboard Top Country Albums chart.

Track listing

Personnel

 Ricky Skaggs – lead vocals, electric guitar, acoustic guitar, mandolin, mandocaster, fiddle
 Bruce Bouton – dobro, electric guitar, pedal steel guitar
 Richard Dennison – electric guitar, acoustic guitar, background vocals
 Bobby Hicks – banjo, fiddle
 Lou Reid – banjo, fiddle, acoustic guitar, background vocals
 Gary "Bud" Smith – piano, keyboard
 Jesse Chambers – bass guitar
 Martin Parker – drums, percussion
 Elvis Costello – guitar and vocals on "Don't Get Above Your Raisin"

Charts

Weekly charts

Year-end charts

References

1985 live albums
Ricky Skaggs albums
Epic Records live albums
Albums produced by Ricky Skaggs